Coriolano Cippico (1425–1493) was a Dalmatian nobleman, landowner, civil servant, humanist and military commander from Trogir. From 1470 to 1470 he served as galley captain under the future doge Pietro Mocenigo and wrote an elegant, humanist, eye-witness account of the systematic depredation of the Anatolian coast by the Venetian navy.

Bibliography
• Online Biography

•

References

1425 births
1493 deaths
Dalmatian Italians
People from Trogir